The Stade de Tourbillon is a multi-purpose stadium in Sion, Switzerland.  It is currently used mostly for football matches and is the home stadium of FC Sion.  The stadium holds 16,000 people and was built in 1968 and renovated in 1989. At the time of the renovation, its capacity was 19,600. The stadium's LED scoreboard is powered by ColosseoEAS's miniDirector coupled with a miniTimer.

International matches

References

Tourbillon
Buildings and structures in Valais
Multi-purpose stadiums in Switzerland
Sion, Switzerland